Percy Alexander McKelvey (November 25, 1896 – January 2, 1986) was a provincial politician from Alberta, Canada. He served as a member of the Legislative Assembly of Alberta from 1940 to 1944, as an "Independent" (People's League (Alberta)) MLA for the constituency of Ponoka.

He did not run for re-election in 1944.

References

1986 deaths
1896 births
Independent Alberta MLAs
People from Trail, British Columbia
People from Ponoka, Alberta